Nikolas Matinpalo (born October 5, 1998) is a Finnish professional ice hockey defenceman. He is currently playing for Ässät of the Liiga.

Matinpalo made his Liiga debut with Ilves during the 2018–19 Liiga season.

References

External links

1998 births
Living people
Ässät players
Finnish ice hockey defencemen
Ilves players
KOOVEE players
Sportspeople from Espoo